† Bembexia is a genus of fossil sea snails, marine gastropod mollusks. This genus is placed in the subfamily Eotomariinae, of the family Eotomariidae. The shell characters resemble those of Balbinipleura. These snails have been interpreted as herbivorous, probably grazing on algae.

Other fossil sites include Alaska, Western Europe including the UK, Venezuela, China and Australia.

Species
Species within the genus Bembexia include:
 Bembexia adjutor
 Bembexia babini
 Bembexia chapernowni
 Bembexia crenatostriata
 Bembexia disjuncta
 Bembexia gradilispira
 Bembexia headillus
 Bembexia insolita
 Bembexia inumbilicata
 Bembexia laevis
 Bembexia larteti
 Bembexia micula
 Bembexia minima
 Bembexia neapolitana
 Bembexia planidorsalis
 Bembexia procteri
 Bembexia seminuda
 Bembexia testis

References

Eotomariidae